The 2020 Tour du Rwanda was a road cycling stage race that took place in Rwanda between 23 February and 1 March 2020. The race was rated as a 2.1 event as part of the 2020 UCI Africa Tour, and was the 23rd edition of the Tour du Rwanda.

Swiss rider Patrick Schelling of  originally finished third, but it was revealed in September 2020 that he had tested positive for use of terbutaline, an unauthorized asthma drug, on stage 2 on 24 February. As a result of the 'non-intentional anti-doping rule violation,' Schelling was stripped of his results from this race and was handed a four-month suspension that retroactively began on 18 May 2020.

Teams
Sixteen teams were invited to the race, of which one was a UCI WorldTeam, four were UCI ProTeams, eight were UCI Continental teams, and three were national teams. Each team entered five riders into the race for a total of 80 riders, of which 58 finished the race.

UCI WorldTeams

 

UCI ProTeams

 
 
 
 

UCI Continental Teams

 
 
 
 
 
 
 
 

National Teams

 Eritrea
 Ethiopia
 Rwanda

Route

Stages

Stage 1
23 February 2020 — Kigali (Kigali Arena) to Kigali (Kimironko),

Stage 2 
24 February 2020 — Kigali (MIC Building) to Huye,

Stage 3 
25 February 2020 — Huye to Rusizi,

Stage 4 
26 February 2020 — Rusizi to Rubavu,

Stage 5 
27 February 2020 — Rubavu to Musanze,

Stage 6 
28 February 2020 — Musanze to Muhanga,

Stage 7 
29 February 2020 — Kigali (Nyamirambo) to Kigali (Mur de Kigali),  (ITT)

Stage 8 
1 March 2020 — Kigali (PSF Expo Ground) to Kigali (Rebero),

Classification leadership table

Final classification standings

General classification

Mountains classification

Young rider classification

Sprints classification

Best African rider classification

Teams classification

References

External links

2020
2020 UCI Africa Tour
2020 in Rwandan sport